Ella Auerbach (January 15, 1900 in Frankfurt am Main – April 20, 1999 in New York) was one of the first female German lawyers. On 20 November 1922, Auerbach passed her junior law exam and was sworn in early December 1922 as the first woman in Bad Homburg as a trainee lawyer. Moving to America in 1940, Auerbach became president of the Sisterhood of the New York community Habonim, was a member of the women's group of the Leo Baeck Institute for many years and was a member of the American Federation of Jews from Central Europe.

References

1900 births
1999 deaths
Jurists from Frankfurt
German women lawyers
20th-century German lawyers
German emigrants to the United States
20th-century women lawyers
20th-century German women